Red pudding is a meat dish served mainly at chip shops in some areas of Scotland. Red pudding is associated with the east of Scotland, particularly Fife, but has become less common in recent years. Its main ingredients are beef, pork, pork rind or bacon, suet, rusk, wheat flour, spices, salt, beef fat and colouring.

The mixture is formed into a sausage shape of roughly eight inches in length, similar to black and white pudding and the chip shop variant of haggis. The pudding is usually cooked by being coated in a batter, deep fried, and served hot. Bought on its own, it is known as a "single red"; when accompanied by chips, it is known as a "red pudding supper".

Other regional varieties
In Scotland some butchers sell a different form of red pudding, made entirely of finely minced pork and formed into a ring similar to black pudding. These red puddings follow a quite different recipe from the chip shop red pudding, are flavoured with spices such as cumin, and are identified by a red casing. They were traditionally made by "German" pork butchers in parts of Scotland, mostly on the east coast, and are usually cooked for breakfast. Another form of red pudding is a speciality of Dundalk on the east coast of Ireland; this is an oatmeal-based pudding similar to white pudding.

References

See also
Boudin
Scrapple

Savory puddings
Scottish cuisine
Scottish sausages
British pork dishes